Grover Cleveland Park, the seventh-largest park in the Essex County, New Jersey, USA, county-park system, is a heavily wooded park covering  in the western section of Essex County along the Caldwell-Essex Fells border. 

A small footbridge at the far end of the pond was the location of a one-time sawmill. Several foot bridges connect the two areas of the park divided by the stream.

The park was acquired between 1913 and 1916 and is named after President Grover Cleveland who was born in Caldwell, and was the 22nd and 24th President of the United States.

The Olmsted Brothers were asked to create a plan for recreation use of most of the park area. By the summer of 1914, development of recreation facilities — including tennis courts, baseball fields, a playground, sand court, wading pool, and a shelter house to service these facilities — was underway, with improvements completed for public use by 1916.

Park features include lighted tennis courts, shuffleboard courts, horseshoe pitches, fieldhouse, baseball field, summer concert activities, playground, fishing, jogging walkways, picnic grove, and ice skating.

External links
Grover Cleveland Park Conservancy
Essex County Web Site
Caldwell, New Jersey: Grover Cleveland Park

Parks in Essex County, New Jersey
County parks in New Jersey